Luanuu County is a former county in the Manu'a District in American Samoa. It reported on the 1912 special census and the 1920 U.S. Census. It was subdivided into the present Ofu and Olosega Counties in 1930. It contained the villages of Ofu, Olosega and Sili.

Demographics

Luanuu County was first recorded beginning with the 1912 special census. Regular decennial censuses were taken beginning in 1920. It was dissolved and subdivided into Ofu and Olosega Counties in 1930.

Villages
Ofu
Olosega
Sili

References 

 

Populated places in American Samoa